The Shaoshan 1 is a type of AC-powered electric locomotive used by China Railway. This locomotive was the first Chinese electric main line locomotive, built by the Zhuzhou Electric Locomotive Works with the assistance of the Soviet Union and following the design of the Soviet-H60 electric locomotive (SŽD VL60). The power supply was industrial-frequency single-phase AC, and the axle arrangement Co-Co.

History
The first prototype locomotive, 6Y1-001, which used an ignitron-controlled rectifier, was produced in 1958. A further 6 prototypes (002 to 007) were produced between 1962 and 1966. A silicon semiconductor-controlled rectifier was used from No. 004 onwards.

In response to technology of the French-made 6Y2 locomotive, Zhuzhou Plant made major modification in the design of the 6Y1 locomotive, improving the reliability of the rectifier, traction motors and rheostatic braking system. The eighth locomotive, No. 008, was produced in 1968. The series was also renamed from 6Y1 to SS1 (SS stands for Shaoshan, birthplace of Chinese leader Mao Zedong). The model went out of production in 1988 with a total of 826 manufactured: 7 of 6Y1 and 819 of SS1.

Gallery

Preservation
 SS1-008: is preserved at the China Railway Museum.
 SS1-061: is preserved at Baoji Electric Locomotive Repair Depot
 SS1-156: is preserved at Zhengzhou Century Amusement Park
 SS1-160: is preserved at Beijing Railway Electrification College
 SS1-254: is preserved at Fengtai Locomotive Depot, Beijing Railway Bureau.
 SS1-277: is preserved at Heilongjiang Communications Polytechnic.
 SS1-307: is preserved at Yuci Reentry Depot, Taiyuan Railway Bureau
 SS1-309: is preserved at Taiyuan Locomotive Depot, Taiyuan Railway Bureau
 SS1-321: is preserved at Wuhan Railway Vocational College Of Technology
 SS1 0681  is preserved at the China Railway Museum.
 SS1-695: is preserved at the Shenyang Railway Museum.
 SS1 0818: is preserved at the Southwest Jiaotong University.

References

25 kV AC locomotives
Co-Co locomotives
SS1
Zhuzhou locomotives
Railway locomotives introduced in 1968
Standard gauge locomotives of China